Camp Myles Standish was a U.S. Army camp located in Taunton, Massachusetts during World War II. It was the main staging area for the Boston Port of Embarkation, with about a million U.S. and Allied soldiers passing through the camp on their way overseas or returning for demobilization after the war. It was also a prisoner-of-war camp. Immediately after the war, it was considered as a candidate site for the United Nations Headquarters.

History
The city of Taunton was notified in June 1942 by the War Department that  would be taken for use as a military staging area. The design of the layout for the camp was made by the J.F. Worcester Company. The Matthew Cummings Company of Boston received the contract to construct the buildings. The camp opened on October 8, 1942 and was named in honor of Myles Standish who was the first military commander of the Plymouth Colony region. Camp Myles Standish was the main staging area for the Boston Port of Embarkation where American soldiers as well as soldiers from Canada, Great Britain and Australia processed before moving to the European Theater of World War II, or after returning to the US for demobilization. The camp covered  and could accommodate 1,298 officers and 23,100 enlisted personnel.

As such, a garrison quartermaster was set up so an entire division could be prepared for deployment within a day or arrival. This made train traffic understandably chaotic, with trains regularly coming into town from Providence, Rhode Island, Springfield, Massachusetts and Boston. The yard itself, run by the New Haven Railroad, contained about ten miles of track.

German soldiers who were captured during the war were detained at this camp.  Italian soldiers were detained there as well although they were considered 'co-belligerents' because Italy had surrendered by the time the Italian soldiers arrived at Camp Myles Standish.

The camp closed in January 1946 following World War II. The site of Camp Myles Standish was briefly considered as a possible site for the United Nations.

There are several buildings that were once part of Camp Myles Standish that still remain standing as of 2009.

Redevelopment
The Commonwealth of Massachusetts took over the site from the federal government to create the Myles Standish State School for the Mentally Retarded. The patients of the institution were housed in the former hospital area for the former army camp. In 1951, Governor Paul A. Dever was instrumental in providing for over two dozen new brick buildings on the south part of the former army camp site.  Following the death of former Governor Paul A. Dever, the Myles Standish State School was dedicated in memory of Paul A. Dever.
The Myles Standish Industrial Park has continued to expand and has become one of the most successful industrial parks in the Commonwealth of Massachusetts.

Units that passed through Camp Myles Standish
99th Infantry Division
106th Infantry Division
76th Infantry Division
10th Tank Battalion
11th Armored Division
172nd Infantry Brigade
17th Airborne Division
17th Field Artillery Brigade
20th Armored Division
20th Fighter Group
26th Infantry Division
29th Transport Squadron
34th Tank Battalion
289th Engineer Combat Battalion
372nd Military Police Company
395th Infantry Regiment
452d Bombardment Squadron (Medium)
361st Fighter Squadron
47th Troop Carrier Squadron
49th Troop Carrier Squadron
501st Infantry Regiment
555th Signal Aircraft Warning Battalion
643rd Tank Destroyer Battalion 
669 Engineer Topographic Company
556th Antiaircraft Automatic Weapons Battalion (Mobile)
218th CIC Detachment (Airborne)
57th Fighter Group
5th Ranger Battalion
68th Armor Regiment
70th Infantry Division
712th Tank Battalion
95th Infantry Division
99th Bombardment Wing
III Corps
30th Cavalry Reconnaissance Troop (Mechanized) of the 30th Infantry Division
167th Engineer Combat Battalion
980th Field Artillery Battalion
336th Engineer Combat Battalion
24th Armored Engineer Battalion
93rd Chemical Mortar Battalion
524th Military Police Battalion

See also
 List of military installations in Massachusetts

References

External links
Welcome back poster
Information on the industrial park
USGS map of the western part of the camp
USGS map of the eastern part of the camp

Installations of the U.S. Army in Massachusetts
World War II prisoner of war camps in the United States
Defunct prisons in Massachusetts
Buildings and structures in Taunton, Massachusetts
1942 establishments in Massachusetts
1948 disestablishments in Massachusetts